Saspeires (sasp'erebi, other names include Saspers, Saspines, Sapinians, and Sapirians) are a people of uncertain origin mentioned by Herodotus. According to the most widespread theory, they are a Kartvelian tribe, however, their origins have also been attributed to Scythian people. The toponym of modern day city İspir and ancient region of Speri is thought by some to be derived from their name. According to Rayfield, Diauehi is mentioned in the Greek records as Taochoi, but Herodotus in 450 BC refers to them as Sasperi. the name Sper with a Georgian prefix of place Sa-, which evolved into the term Iberian.

The Saspires were originally associated with the Caucasian Iberians and appear to have emerged from the Lesser Caucasus to the east.
The Alarodians, Colchians, and Saspires were joined in one command, and all were dressed alike.
The Colchians themselves, were not classified as belonging to any Satrapy. The Colchians, however, attended the army of Xerxes as auxiliaries. The incredible number of tribes of Mount Caucasus is spoken by ancient as modern historians.
According to some authors, they constituted a significant part of the population of the early Georgian Kingdom of Iberia and played a large role in the ethnogenesis of the Georgian nation.

See also
İspir
Speri

References

Ancient peoples of Georgia (country)
Tribes described primarily by Herodotus